The women's 200m individual medley SM6 event at the 2012 Summer Paralympics took place at the  London Aquatics Centre on 3 September. There were two heats; the swimmers with the eight fastest times advanced to the final.

Results

Heats
Competed from 09:47.

Heat 1

Heat 2

Final
Competed at 17:39.

 
'Q = qualified for final. WR = World Record.

References
Official London 2012 Paralympics Results: Heats 
Official London 2012 Paralympics Results: Final 

Swimming at the 2012 Summer Paralympics
2012 in women's swimming